The Honey Feast of the Saviour or Wet Saviour known as the Honey Spas is the First Saviour Day of a triduum in honor of the Saviour, celebrated on August 1 in the Julian calendar which corresponds to August 14 in the Gregorian calendar. It is followed by the Apple Feast on August 6 and the Nut Feast of the Saviour on August 16 in the Orthodox calendar. On that day, the Orthodox Church honors the memory of three shrines: the Life-Giving Cross of the Lord , the image of the Savior and the icon of the Virgin of Vladimir. It is also the first day of the Dormition Fast. There are usually processions and water blessings on the rivers, during which people and cattle bathe in the consecrated water, and wells are consecrated.

Etymology 
It is believed that the name Spas was given in honor of Jesus Christ the Savior. According to N. V. Solodovnikova, the word "Spas" which translates as "saved" means "saving yourself".

Folk etymology on the other hand has rethought the name of the holiday in connection with the Papaver poppy, which ripens by this time.

Liturgy 

It is traditionally believed that the two weeks of the Spas festival from the Honey Saviour to the Nut Saviour  were 'cut off' by God from Great Lent. In fact, these three feasts are known as Second Spas in comparison with the First Spas which are the major feasts of Jesus Christ.

The divine liturgy is usually celebrated with pump and circumstance and followed to a procession to the local well.

After the liturgical celebration, young people dance with the song “Oh, poppy on the mountain”, («Ой, на горе мак») with playful round dances, the girls showered the boys with poppy seeds: singing: “Poppies, poppies, poppies, golden heads!” («Маки, маки, маковицы, золотые головицы!»).

Origin

An agricultural cycle 

The holiday of the Honey Saviour has a pre-Christian origin and is associated with harvesting of honey. 

The first Spas is called the Honey Saviour, because the honeycombs in the hives are usually already filled by this time, and the beekeepers begin to collect. It was believed that if the beekeeper did not break the honeycomb, then the neighboring bees would pull out all the honey. According to tradition, it was allowed to eat consecrated honey from that day.

The festival also corresponds to the time when sowing winter rye usually begins.

Sergei Tokarev relates these traditions with an ancient ritual of consecrating the first fruits of the earth to a pagan deity.

A biblical tradition: the martyr of the Maccabees 
In the Orthodox tradition, this festival is also the liturgical celebration of the woman with seven sons who died as martyrs in 166 BC according to the Second Book of Maccabees.

A historical event: the battle of Andrei the Pious 
The Honey Saviour Day was established following the recognition of miraculous signs during the battle of prince Andrey Bogolyubsky against the Volga Bulgars in 1164. According to tradition, ominous signs of victory came from icons of the Saviour and the Holy Virgin during this battle.

Traditions

Digging wells 
The feast of the Honey Saviour is associated with a water festival called the small blessing of the water in contrast with the great blessing associated with the feasts of Easter and the Baptism of the Lord. 

Traditionally, it was at this time in Russia that new wells were consecrated and old ones were cleaned, and they also made a procession to natural reservoirs and springs to consecrate water. After the procession, they bathed in consecrated water and bathed livestock to wash away all diseases. 

The Serbs of the Leskovac consider this time to be suitable for digging and cleaning wells.

Honeycomb crosses 
During the festival, a special blessing is given to newly harvested honey. Honeycomb crosses are carved out and carried in procession. At private homes the newly blessed honey is laid out in beautiful cups and put in the center of the table. Russians usually put the honey in painted cups known as gzhel.

It is also traditional to feed honey to relatives, neighbors and beggars. Blessed honey is also used to bake honey gingerbread, pies, buns, and the traditional drink of this holiday is a sbiten, consisting of water, honey and spicy herbs.

Poppy seed rolls 

On this day, the faithful bake poppy seed rolls. The festive meal  often begins with this dish.

Poppy milk is prepared for pancakes in a makitra with poppy-honey mass, in which pancakes are dipped. Poppy milk as prepared in a special dish, which in Russia is called a makalnik, in Ukraine - makitra, in Belarus - makater.

Poppy seed rolls are mentioned in many Russian proverbs, sayings, choral songs and riddles: “A poppy seed roll with honey will make you will lick your mustache”,  “When you eat the poppy, do not be angry”.

Blini and pryanik are also part of the culinary traditions of this festival.

References 

Beekeeping
Honey
Folk calendar of the East Slavs
Summer holidays